Barby Storage Reservoir is a reservoir near Barby in Northamptonshire, England, owned and operated by Severn Trent Water. It supplies drinking water to Rugby, being fed by water pumped from Draycote Water.

Reservoirs in Northamptonshire
Drinking water reservoirs in England